Women's Football Australia (WFA) was the governing body for the sport of Women's Australian rules football in Australia between 1991 and its dissolution in 2015. The organisation coordinated the Women's National Championship throughout its existence. 

In 2010, the AFL gained control over women's Australian rules football, and took over the operations of Women's Football Australia.

After the 2015 edition, the AFL arranged the 2016 Exhibition Series and announced the formation of the AFLW in September 2016, along with other associated competitions including the AFL Women's Under 18 Championships and the NAB League Girls: with this, the raison d'etre for Women's Football Australia and the Championship ceased to exist, and they were both dissolved.

Consequently, the leagues it ran were either dissolved and replaced by AFL-sanctioned leagues, or are now operated by the AFL or its state/territory level bodies.

Leagues
Victorian Women's Football League
ACTWAFL
West Australian Women's Football League
South Australian Women's Football League
Sydney Women's AFL
Northern Territory Women's Aussie Rules Football Association
Queensland Women's AFL
Cairns Women's AFL
Townsville Women's AFL
Mackay Women's AFL

Youth Leagues
Victorian Youth Girls Competition
Queensland Youth Girls Competition
South Australia Schoolgirls AFL
West Australia Schoolgirls AFL

See also

List of Australian rules football women's leagues

References

External links

 
1997 establishments in Australia
Sports organizations established in 1997
AFL Women's National Championship